The Lake Erie Islands are a chain of archipelagic islands in Lake Erie. They include Kelleys Island, Erie Island, Pelee Island, the Bass Islands, and several others. The majority of these islands are under the sovereignty of the State of Ohio in the United States. Pelee Island is the only major inhabited island within the province of Ontario, while the smaller Middle Island is the southmost point of land in Canada.

Most of the larger islands are popular tourist attractions, served by car ferries running from the mainland and between some islands. Some small airports and numerous private marinas offer other ways for visitors to reach the islands. Combined with nearby Sandusky and Port Clinton, Ohio, the islands are part of the collective area known regionally as "Vacationland".

Geology

The Lake Erie Islands are geologically part of the Silurian Columbus Limestone. When the Pleistocene ice sheets carved out the basin of modern-day Lake Erie, these hard rocks proved more resistant to erosion than the shales in the east, and as a result, Lake Erie's western end is much shallower than the basins in the east, so that the islands remain above water.
Quarrying operations on Kelleys Island revealed glacial grooves in the bedrock, which would in time be regarded as some of the best direct evidence of the Pleistocene ice sheets available anywhere. The glacial grooves are now protected as part of Kelleys Island State Park.

Economy
Most of the islands are supported financially via tourism. Grape growing and wineries were once the mainstay of the economy. Kelleys Island is heavily forested and woods have replaced vineyards there almost entirely. South Bass Island is more developed and still has a few  vineyards. Pelee Island is the only major island where vineyards remain common. Limestone quarrying still occurs on Kelleys Island, and also there are a few hobby farms.  South Bass, Middle Bass, North Bass, and Kelleys Islands all have active state parks part of the Ohio Department of Natural Resources with North Bass Island State Park being the largest at 593 acres and 90% of North Bass Island (also known as Isle St. George).

Residents
Most of the islands are headed by a small group of year-round residents. However, eager vacationers often raise the populations dramatically during the summer months, most notable on South Bass Island, which is the most tourist-friendly of the islands despite its small size.   The islands vary by year-round population of approximately 500 on South Bass Island, 100 for Kelleys Island, 40 at Middle Bass Island and 12 on North Bass Island.

Kelleys Island, Middle Bass, North Bass and South Bass (Put-in-Bay) have active school districts with North Bass Local School District being the last operating one-room schoolhouse in Ohio.     Of the islands with year-round residents, only North Bass has no ferry service.  Put-in-Bay Township Port Authority operates public airports for Middle, North and South Bass Islands.   Kelleys Island and Pelee Island operate paved, public runways and Rattlesnake Island maintains a private grass landing strip.

Lake Erie islands

See also
 Battle of Lake Erie
 Islands of the Great Lakes

References

External links

 How many islands are there in Lake Erie?
Explore the Lake Erie Islands: Self-guided Tours to Natural Wonders & Historic Tales (pdf) — A Guide to Nature and History along the Lake Erie Coastal Ohio Trail.

Regions of Ohio
Lists of islands of the United States